The 17th Assembly District of Wisconsin is one of 99 districts in the Wisconsin State Assembly.  Located in southeast Wisconsin, the district is entirely contained within the boundaries of the city of Milwaukee in central Milwaukee County.  It comprises neighborhoods of Milwaukee's west side, including northern Enderis Park, Capitol Heights, and Lincoln Creek.  It includes the historic Holy Cross Catholic Cemetery and Mount Mary University.  The district is represented by Democrat Supreme Moore Omokunde, since January 2021.

The 17th Assembly district is located within Wisconsin's 6th Senate district, along with the 16th and 18th Assembly districts.

List of past representatives

References 

Wisconsin State Assembly districts
Milwaukee County, Wisconsin